Tape or Tapes may refer to:

Material
A long, narrow, thin strip of material (see also Ribbon (disambiguation):

Adhesive tapes

Adhesive tape, any of many varieties of backing materials coated with an adhesive
Athletic tape, pressure-sensitive tape that holds muscles or bones in certain positions
 Box-sealing tape, a pressure-sensitive tape used for closing or sealing corrugated fiberboard boxes
 Copper tape (or slug tape), adhesive-backed copper tape used to keep slugs and snails out of certain areas
 Double-sided tape, any pressure-sensitive tape that is coated with adhesive on both sides
 Duct tape, cloth- or scrim-backed pressure-sensitive tape often coated with polyethylene
 Elastic therapeutic tape
 Electrical tape, a type of pressure-sensitive tape used to insulate electrical wires and other materials that conduct electricity
 Filament tape, a pressure-sensitive tape used for several packaging functions
 Gaffer tape, a strong, tough, cotton cloth pressure-sensitive tape with strong adhesive properties
 Heat tape, a system used to maintain or raise the temperature of pipes and vessels to protect pipes from freezing or maintain a constant flow temperature
 Hockey tape, cloth-based self-adhesive tape used by ice hockey, roller hockey, and lacrosse players
 Masking tape, also known as painter's tape or sticky tape, a type of pressure-sensitive tape made of a thin and easy-to-tear paper, and an easily released pressure-sensitive adhesive
 Pressure-sensitive tape, adhesive tape that will stick with application pressure, without the need for solvent, heat, or water
 Scotch Tape, a brand name used for certain pressure-sensitive tapes manufactured by 3M
 Self-amalgamating tape, a non-tacky silicone-rubber tape which when stretched and wrapped around items amalgamates itself into a strong insulating layer
 Surgical tape, or medical tape, a form of pressure-sensitive adhesive tape used in medicine and first aid as a bandage to hold a dressing onto a wound
 Twill tape, a flat twill-woven ribbon of cotton, linen, polyester, or wool used in sewing

Markings or signals
Barricade tape, also known as caution tape or police tap, resilient plastic tape of a signal color to catch the attention of passerby
Detectable tape, a tape buried near underground structures to make them visible to utility location devices
Flagging (tape), a colored non-adhesive tape used in marking objects

Recording media
Compact Cassette or cassette tape, a magnetic tape recording format for audio recording and playback
Digital Audio Tape (DAT), a signal recording and playback medium developed by Sony and introduced in 1987
Digital Compact Cassette (DCC), a magnetic tape sound recording format introduced by Philips and Matsushita in late 1992 and marketed as the successor to the standard analog Compact Cassette
Digital Tape Format, a magnetic tape data storage format developed by Sony
Magnetic tape, a medium for magnetic recording, made of a thin magnetizable coating on a long, narrow strip of plastic film
Magnetic tape data storage, uses digital recording on magnetic tape to store digital information
Punched tape or paper tape, a long strip of paper in which holes are punched to store data
Reel-to-reel audio tape recording, magnetic tape audio recording in which the recording medium is held on a reel, rather than being contained within a cassette
Tape drive, a data storage device that reads and writes data on a magnetic tape
Tape recorder, an audio storage device that records and plays back sounds using magnetic tape
Tape head, a type of transducer used in tape recorders to convert electrical signals to magnetic fluctuations and vice versa
Ticker tape, the earliest digital electronic communications medium, transmitting stock price information over telegraph lines
Videotape, a recording of images and sounds on to magnetic tape as opposed to film stock used in filmmaking or random access digital media

Other functions
Barbed tape or razor wire, a mesh of metal strips with sharp edges whose purpose is to prevent passage by humans
Bubble Tape, a brand of bubble gum produced by Wm. Wrigley Jr. Company
Tape (surveying), used in surveying for measuring horizontal, vertical, or slope distances
Tape measure, or measuring tape, a flexible form of ruler
Thread seal tape, also known as plumber's tape or "Teflon tape", film for use in sealing pipe threads

Geography
Tape, Burma, a river village in Homalin Township
Tapes, Rio Grande do Sul, a municipality in Rio Grande do Sul, Brazil

People
Mougnini Tape (born 1990), Ivorian footballer
Seb Tape (born 1992), Australian rules footballer

Arts, entertainment, and media

Films
Tape (film), a 2001 movie directed by Richard Linklater
Tape (play), a 1999 play by Stephen Belber

Music
"Tape", a 1996 song by Sharon Stoned
"Tape", a 2018 song by Brockhampton from Iridescence
The Tape (album), Kid Capri album
Tape (album), Patty Griffin album

Television
TAPE Inc., a television production company in the Philippines
"The Tape", a Seinfeld episode

Other uses
Red tape, a colloquialism for heavy or undesirable bureaucratic process
Tapai (also tapay or tape), a traditional fermented food found throughout much of Southeast Asia and parts of East Asia

See also
Ribbon (disambiguation)
Spike (stagecraft) a marking, usually made with a piece of tape, put on or around the stage
Strapping

es:Cinta
fr:Ruban
ja:テープ
pl:Taśma
pt:Fita
sv:Tejp